The 2009–10 Liga Nacional de Ascenso de Honduras season is the 31st season of the Liga Nacional de Ascenso de Honduras, the second division of football in Honduras. It is contested by 28 teams, split into two zones with two divisions each.

The season is split into two separate competitions, the Apertura and the Clausura. After the end of the Clausura, the winners of both competitions will face off against each other in order to determine the team which will earn promotion to the Liga Nacional de Fútbol de Honduras for the 2010–11 season.

Teams

Torneo Apertura
The 2009–10 Apertura began on ???? 2009 with the first matches of the regular season and ended on 20 December 2009 with the second leg of the Finals. It was won by Necaxa, who beat Atlético Choloma in the Finals with an aggregated score of 3–1.

Regular season
Each of the seven teams in every group played its opponents once at home and once away for a total of twelve matches. The top two teams of each group qualified for the Final Round.

Zona Central Group A
Note: The standings are incomplete.

Zona Central Group B
Note: The standings are incomplete.

Zona Nor-occidental Group A

Zona Nor-Occidental Group B
Note: The standings are incomplete.

Final round

Quarterfinals

Semifinals

Final

Necaxa won on 3-1 on aggregate score.

Torneo Clausura
The Torneo Clausura will begin on ???? 2010 with the first matches of the regular season and end on ???? 2010 with the second leg of the Finals.

Regular season

Zona Central Group A

Zona Central Group B

Zona Nor-Occidental Group A

Zona Nor-Occidental Group B

Final Round

Quarterfinals

Semifinals

Final

 Necaxa won 3–2 on aggregate score.

Promotion playoff
To be played between winners of Apertura and Clausura tournaments.

 Necaxa automatically promoted as winner of both Apertura and Clausura, Promotion playoff unnecessary.

2009–10 in Honduran football
2009–10 in Central American second tier football leagues
Honduran Liga Nacional de Ascenso seasons